Verrucomicrobiota is a phylum of Gram-negative bacteria that contains only a few described species. The species identified have been isolated from fresh water, marine and soil environments and human faeces. A number of as-yet uncultivated species have been identified in association with eukaryotic hosts including extrusive explosive ectosymbionts of protists and endosymbionts of nematodes residing in their gametes.

Verrucomicrobiota are abundant within the environment, though relatively inactive. This phylum is considered to have two sister phyla: Chlamydiota (formerly Chlamydiae) and Lentisphaerota (formerly Lentisphaerae) within the PVC superphylum. The Verrucomicrobiota phylum can be distinguished from neighbouring phyla within the PVC group by the presence of several conserved signature indels (CSIs). These CSIs represent unique, synapomorphic characteristics that suggest common ancestry within Verrucomicrobiota and an independent lineage amidst other bacteria. CSIs have also been found that are shared by Verrucomicrobiota and Chlamydiota exclusively of all other bacteria. These CSIs provide evidence that Chlamydiota is the closest relative to Verrucomicrobiota, and that they are more closely related to one another than to the Planctomycetales.

Verrucomicrobiota might belong in the clade Planctobacteria in the larger clade Gracilicutes.

In 2008, the whole genome of Methylacidiphilum infernorum (2.3 Mbp) was published. On the single circular chromosome, 2473 predicted proteins were found, 731 of which had no detectable homologs. These analyses also revealed many possible homologies with Pseudomonadota.

Phylogeny

Taxonomy
The currently accepted taxonomy is based on the List of Prokaryotic names with Standing in Nomenclature (LPSN) and National Center for Biotechnology Information (NCBI)

 Genus ?"Ca. Epixenosoma" Bauer et al. 2005
 Genus ?"Methyloacida" Islam et al. 2008
 Genus ?"Nucleococcus" Sato et al. 2014
 Class Opitutae Choo et al. 2007
 Order Opitutales Choo et al. 2007
 Family CAG-312
 Genus "Ca. Merdousia" Gilroy et al. 2021
 Family UBA953
 Genus "Ca. Spyradosoma" Gilroy et al. 2021
 Family KCTC-12870
 Genus Ruficoccus Lin et al. 2017
 Genus Cerasicoccus Yoon et al. 2007
 Family DSM-45221
 Genus "Lentimonas" Choo & Cho 2006
 Genus Coraliomargarita Yoon et al. 2007
 Family Puniceicoccaceae Choo et al. 2007
 Genus "Ca. Fucivorax" Orellana et al. 2022
 Genus "Ca. Marcellius" Nixon et al. 2019
 Genus Oceanipulchritudo Feng et al. 2020
 Genus "Ca. Pinguicoccus" Serra et al. 2020
 Genus Puniceicoccus Choo et al. 2007
 Family UBA2987
 Genus "Ca. Moanibacter" corrig. Vosseberg, Martijn & Ettema 2018
 Family Opitutaceae Choo et al. 2007
 Genus Alterococcus Shieh and Jean 1999
 Genus Cephaloticoccus Lin et al. 2016
 Genus "Ca. Didemniditutus" corrig. Lopera et al. 2017
 Genus Ereboglobus Tegtmeier et al. 2018
 Genus "Geminisphaera" Wertz et al. 2018
 Genus "Lacunisphaera" Rast et al. 2017
 Genus Nibricoccus Baek et al. 2019
 Genus Oleiharenicola Rochman et al. 2018
 Genus Opitutus Chin et al. 2001
 Genus Pelagicoccus Yoon et al. 2007
 Genus Rariglobus Pitt et al. 2020
 Genus "Ca. Synoicihabitans" Murray et al. 2021
 Class "Methylacidiphilae"
 Order "Methylacidiphilales" Op den Camp 2009
 Family "Methylacidiphilaceae" Op den Camp 2009
 Genus "Methylacidimicrobium" van Teeseling et al. 2014
 Genus "Methylacidiphilum" Hou et al. 2008
 Genus "Ca. Methylacidithermus" Picone et al. 2021
 Family NGM72-4
 Genus Limisphaera Anders et al. 2015
 Family "Pedosphaeraceae"
 Genus "Pedosphaera" Ozyurt 2008
 Class Terrimicrobia García-López et al. 2020
 Order Terrimicrobiales García-López et al. 2020
 Family "Chthoniobacteraceae" Sangwan et al. 2004
 Genus "Chthoniobacter" Sangwan et al. 2004
 Family Terrimicrobiaceae García-López et al. 2020 
 Genus Terrimicrobium Qiu et al. 2014
 Family UBA10450
 Genus "Ca. Udaeobacter" Brewer et al. 2016
 Family "Xiphinematobacteraceae" 
 Genus "Ca. Xiphinematobacter" Vandekerckhove et al. 2000
 Class Verrucomicrobiae Hedlund et al. 1998
 Order Verrucomicrobiales Ward-Rainey et al. 1996
 Family Akkermansiaceae Hedlund & Derrien 2012
 Genus Akkermansia Derrien et al. 2004
 Genus Haloferula Yoon et al. 2008
 Genus Luteolibacter Yoon et al. 2008
 Genus Persicirhabdus Yoon et al. 2008
 Genus Rubritalea Scheuermayer et al. 2006
 Genus Roseibacillus Yoon et al. 2008
 Family Verrucomicrobiaceae Ward-Rainey et al. 1996
 Genus "Fucophilus" Sakai et al. 2001b
 Genus Brevifollis Otsuka et al. 2013
 Genus Oceaniferula Jin et al. 2022
 Genus Phragmitibacter Szuróczki et al. 2021
 Genus Prosthecobacter Staley et al. 1976 ex Staley et al. 1980
 Genus Roseimicrobium Otsuka et al. 2013
 Genus "Sulfuriroseicoccus" Feng et al. 2022
 Genus Terrimicrobium Qiu et al. 2014
 Genus Verrucomicrobium Schlesner 1988

See also
 List of bacterial orders
 List of bacteria genera

References

 
Bacteria phyla